The American Biographical Institute (ABI) was a paid-inclusion vanity biographical reference directory publisher based in Raleigh, North Carolina which had been publishing biographies since 1967. It generated revenue from sales of fraudulent certificates and books. Each year the company awarded hundreds of "Man of the Year" or "Woman of the Year" awards at between $195 and $295 each.

Its awards were frequently denounced as scams by politicians, journalists,  and others. The Government of Western Australia's ScamNet service considers the American Biographical Institute to be a scam vanity publisher "who appeals to people who want a plaque on their wall or see their name in a book, even if the honour has no real credibility—in effect, they have purchased the honour." The company went bankrupt in 2012.

The company's owner, Arlene Calhoun, also ran another purveyor of for-profit awards called the United Cultural Convention and another vanity press called the Pentland Press or Ivy House Publishing Group.

Operations

The ABI invited individuals to purchase various honors as a commemorative in their inclusion for a specific biography. One former employee explained that the company bought mailing lists from organizations, and using those names, they sent out blanket mailings inviting individuals to be in biographical books or accept awards. Such honors include "International Man of the Year," "Most Admired Man of the Decade" or "Outstanding Man of the 21st Century" (see list below), or to be included in ABI publications, such as 500 Leaders of Science  or The World Book of Knowledge,  in exchange for a contribution fee.  Those who accept, who sometimes write their own biographies,  are offered books or certificates at prices as high as US $795.

On its website, the publisher describes itself as "one of the world’s leading biographical reference publishers and authorities on global contemporary achievement" and claims that "inclusion in an ABI reference title is based on personal achievement alone and is not available for purchase." The ABI shares an address and P.O. box with the United Cultural Convention, another purveyor of for-profit awards.

The Chairman of the ABI, Arlene Calhoun, also runs another vanity press, Pentland Press (d/b/a Ivy House Publishing Group).

"World Forum"
The ABI is also the co-host with the International Biographical Centre of a yearly World Forum, (previously the International Congress on Arts and Communications) which invites a group for a week of professional seminars, artistic displays, and performances, and culture sharing. Host cities over the 31 yearly meetings have included: New York; Washington D.C.; New Orleans; San Francisco; Edinburgh; Cambridge, UK; Nairobi; Madrid; Lisbon; Cambridge, Mass. USA; Oxford, UK.; Singapore; and Sydney. The Maitre Artiste of Ethiopia, Afewerk Tekle was a regular attendee. No proceedings of these forums are produced except the ABI which includes these in a newsletter. The often prestigious location is then quoted on their literature as if to add gravitas.

In 2007, referring to the International Biographical Centre, the American Biographical Institute, and Marquis Who's Who, Jan Margosian, consumer information coordinator for the Oregon Department of Justice, warned consumers to be wary and called the companies "pretty tacky", adding "I don't know why they would put you in there if they weren't hoping to get you to buy the book. "You truly have to look at how they are marketing and what the spin is. It's something you might want to watch out for."

Awards and titles
New awards are continually created and marketed. Most awards are available for between US $195 and $495, payable by the recipient, depending on their level of prestige and the quality of the printing on the certificate and the material in the frame or mount.  In 2005 the Institute awarded 200 "Man of the Year" awards at between $195 and $295 each.

American Biographical Institute gives awards like Man of The Year or Scientific Award of Excellence to many people in a year. Every award can be purchased from them.

The ABI does not provide a consolidated list of all the awards, medals, diplomas, and certificates it issues,  but the titles of the honors may be identified through the recipients' use of them in their résumés.

See also
 Author mill
 Who's Who scam

References

External links
 Company homepage
  — First-hand account that exposes fraudulent who’s who publishers

Companies based in Raleigh, North Carolina
Publishing companies established in 1967
Book publishing companies based in North Carolina
Self-publishing companies
1967 establishments in North Carolina
Vanity awards